Mount Francis is a  glaciated mountain summit located in the Chugach Mountains, in the U.S. state of Alaska. This feature was named in 1898 by Captain William R. Abercrombie who led an 1898 expedition seeking a route from coastal Alaska to the Klondike. Precipitation runoff and meltwater from the mountain's glaciers drains into tributaries of the Lowe River, which in turn empties to Prince William Sound.

Climate

Based on the Köppen climate classification, Mount Francis is located in a subarctic climate zone with long, cold, snowy winters, and cool summers. Weather systems coming off the Gulf of Alaska are forced upwards by the Chugach Mountains (orographic lift), causing heavy precipitation in the form of rainfall and snowfall. Temperatures can drop below −20 °C with wind chill factors below −30 °C. The months May through June offer the most favorable weather for viewing and climbing.

See also

List of mountain peaks of Alaska
Geography of Alaska

References

Gallery

External links
 Weather forecast: National Weather Service

Francis
Francis
Francis